Pin Hook is an unincorporated community in Iron County, in the U.S. state of Missouri. Pin Hook is on Missouri Route 21 approximately one mile southeast of Belleview.

The community may be named after a nearby meander on Townsen Creek.

References

Unincorporated communities in Iron County, Missouri
Unincorporated communities in Missouri